In fluid dynamics, a secondary circulation or secondary flow is a weak circulation that plays a key maintenance role in sustaining a stronger primary circulation that contains most of the kinetic energy and momentum of a flow.  For example, a tropical cyclone's primary winds are tangential (horizontally swirling), but its evolution and maintenance against friction involves an in-up-out secondary circulation flow that is also important to its clouds and rain. On a planetary scale, Earth's winds are mostly east-west or zonal, but that flow is maintained against friction by the Coriolis force acting on a small north-south or meridional secondary circulation.

See also
 Hough function
 Primitive equations
 Secondary flow

References

Geophysics
Physical oceanography
Atmospheric dynamics
Fluid mechanics